Sir John Franklyn (or Francklin; 22 April 1600 – 24 March 1648) of Dollis Hill, Middlesex was an English politician who sat in the House of Commons at various times between 1625 and 1648.

Franklyn was the son of Richard Franklyn and his wife Frances Roberts, daughter of Francis Roberts of Willesden.  He was knighted on 2 October 1614.

In 1625, Franklyn was elected Member of Parliament for Middlesex.  In April 1640, he was re-elected MP for Middlesex in the Short Parliament and re-elected in November 1640 for the Long Parliament.

He died in 1648 and was buried in the church of St Mary Willesden, where his monument in black and white marble was the work of Sir John Colt. He had married Elizabeth, the daughter of George Purefoy of Wadley, Berkshire, with whom he had 10 sons (3 of whom predeceased him) and 7 daughters (of whom 1 predeceased him). Their son Richard Franklin, MP was created a baronet.

References

 

1600 births
1648 deaths
English MPs 1625
English MPs 1640 (April)
English MPs 1640–1648